This is a list of Norwegian football transfers in the 2020 summer transfer window by club. Only clubs of the 2020 Eliteserien and 2020 1. divisjon are included.

Before the winter transfer window ended on 31 March 2020, Norwegian football was in corona lockdown, and it was decided to open the summer transfer window for two separate periods. One from 10 June to 30 June, before the commencing of league play 16 June, and a second period to be in September. This list includes both transfer windows.

In addition, Norwegian clubs may promote players from their junior ranks at any time. Players aged 18–22 may also be loaned out and recalled from loan at any time.

Eliteserien

Aalesund

In:

Out:

Bodø/Glimt

In:

Out:

Brann

In:

Out:

Haugesund

In:

Out:

Kristiansund

In:

Out:

Mjøndalen

In:

Out:

Molde

In:

Out:

Odd

In:

Out:

Rosenborg

In:

Out:

Sandefjord

In:

Out:

Sarpsborg 08

In:

Out:

Stabæk

In:

 

Out:

Start

In:

Out:

Strømsgodset

In:

Out:

Viking

In:

Out:

Vålerenga

In:

Out:

1. divisjon

Grorud

In:

Out:

HamKam

In:

Out:

Jerv

In:

Out:

KFUM

In:

Out:

Kongsvinger

In:

Out:

Lillestrøm

In:

Out:

Ranheim

In:

Out:

Raufoss

In:

Out:

Sandnes Ulf

In:

Out:

Sogndal

In:

Out:

Stjørdals-Blink

In:

Out:

Strømmen

In:

Out:

Tromsø

In:

Out:

Ull/Kisa

In:

Out:

Øygarden

In:

Out:

Åsane

In:

Out:

References

Norway
Transfers
2020